Underdogs is a 2006 Canadian television series spin-off from Marketplace. Host Wendy Mesley brings together three people, the underdogs, who have a consumer complaint to help them win their way against three companies of Canada.

External links
 CBC Underdogs website

2006 Canadian television series debuts
CBC Television original programming
2000s Canadian television news shows